Tyrone Dworin Rodgers  (born April 27, 1969) is a former American football defensive tackle in the National Football League who played for the Seattle Seahawks (1992–1994).

Early career
Rodgers played high school football at Banning High School in Wilmington, California, where he was teammates with Jamelle Holieway, Leroy Holt, Bob Whitfield, Courtney Hall, Mark Tucker, Ed Lalau, and Marvin Pollard. Rodgers played with a team stacked with talent, where several players went on to play in the NFL.  In Rodgers' junior year, Banning won the L.A. City Section 4A championship, defeating their crosstown archrival Carson High School.

College career
Rodgers originally signed his letter of intent with the University of Oklahoma.   After a recruiting violation by the University of Oklahoma was exposed, the university was placed on probation and lost scholarships.  The NCAA allowed players who were not involved in the recruiting scandal to transfer to other universities and not lose any eligibility, nor be required to sit out for a year.

Rodgers then transferred to the University of Washington, where he played with one of his high school and childhood friends, Terrence Powe. Rodgers helped engineer a Huskies defense that went undefeated and won the 1992 Rose Bowl. The Huskies went on to share the national championship with the Miami Hurricanes.

Professional career
Rodgers signed as an undrafted defensive lineman with the Seattle Seahawks. playing three seasons with the team.

References

1969 births
Living people
American football defensive tackles
American players of Canadian football
BC Lions players
Canadian football defensive linemen
People from Longview, Texas
Players of American football from Los Angeles
Seattle Seahawks players
Washington Huskies football players
Players of Canadian football from Los Angeles